The 2021 Liga 4 was the third season of fourth-tier football in Georgia under its current title. The season began on 30 March and ended on 22 November.

Team changes
The following teams have changed division since the previous season:

To Liga 4

Promoted from Regionuli Liga

Torpedo Kutaisi-2 •	Merani Martvili-2 • Irao Tbilisi	• Dinamo Tbilisi-2 • Matchakhela Khelvachauri • Tbilisi • Margveti 2006 Zestafoni • Shturmi Sartichala

From Liga 4

Promoted to Liga 3

Varketili Tbilisi • Didube Tbilisi • Merani-2 Tbilisi • Magaroeli Chiatura

Teams, results and league tables

The season consisted of two phases. After the draw twenty teams were initially split into White and Red groups.

Part 1
The first part lasted six months with the teams playing eighteen games each.    

Following this two-round tournament the top five clubs formed the Promotion Group while the bottom five took part in the Relegation Round.

Part 2
Despite being in the same group, at this stage no matches were held between the teams who faced each other in Phase 1. Besides, from the previous round the clubs retained only those points obtained in matches against such opponents. It took another seven weeks before each team played ten matches.  At the end the four teams advanced to Liga 3 and another four dropped down to Regionuli Liga.   

Source:

Notes: 

• Whenever the teams finished with an equal number of points, head-to-head results, including away goals, were considered next while determining a league position. 

• Although Algeti are formally registered in Marneuli, the team played all their home games of the season in Tbilisi.

References

External links
Georgian Football Federation

Liga 4 (Georgia) seasons
4
Georgia
Georgia